Events from the year 1909 in the United Kingdom.

Incumbents
 Monarch – Edward VII
 Prime Minister – H. H. Asquith (Liberal)
 Parliament – 28th

Events
 1 January – national old age pension scheme comes into force.
 9 January – Ernest Shackleton's Nimrod Expedition to the South Pole forced to turn back 112 miles from the pole.
 23 January – the Tottenham Outrage, an armed robbery and the murder of a ten-year-old boy and a police constable in Tottenham, North London, carried out by two Latvian anarchists.
 16 February – West Stanley Pit Disaster, a coal mining disaster in Stanley, County Durham, in which more than 160 miners are killed in an explosion.
 22 February – Thomas Beecham conducts the first concert with his newly established Beecham Symphony Orchestra.
 26 February – first film shown in colour using Kinemacolor at the Palace Theatre, London.
 March – construction of the Rosyth Dockyard for the Royal Navy on the east coast of Scotland begins.
 6 March – Birkenhead dock disaster: a temporary cofferdam collapses during construction of Vittoria Dock, killing 14 navvies.
 10 March – Anglo-Siamese Treaty signed in Bangkok.
 15 March – Selfridges department store opens in London.
 16 March – Port of London Authority established.
 11 April – coming into effect of Children Act 1908, establishing separate juvenile courts for ten–sixteen-year-olds; abolishing the use of custody for under-fourteens and hanging for under-sixteens; introducing the registration of foster parents; and restricting access for under-16s to cigarettes and alcohol.
 24 April – the FA Cup final is won by Manchester United for the first time, as they beat Bristol City 1–0 at Crystal Palace.
 29 April – People's Budget introduced in the British Parliament by David Lloyd George.
 2 May – John Moore-Brabazon becomes the first resident British citizen to make a recognised powered heavier-than-air flight in the UK, flying from The Aero Club's ground at Leysdown on the Isle of Sheppey in his Voisin biplane Bird of Passage. 
 13 May – Lonmin is incorporated in the UK as the London and Rhodesian Mining and Land Company Limited.
 26 May – the King's horse, Minoru, wins the Epsom Derby.
 15 June – representatives from England, Australia and South Africa meet at Lord's and form the Imperial Cricket Conference.
 25 June – Herbert Samuel, is appointed Chancellor of the Duchy of Lancaster, making him the first practising Jew to serve as a member of the Cabinet.
 26 June
 Edward VII and Queen Alexandra open the Victoria and Albert Museum, designed by Aston Webb.
 The Science Museum in London comes into existence as an independent entity.
 27 June – Eric Gordon England flies a Weiss glider at Amberley, West Sussex, in the first recorded soaring flight, origin of sport gliding.
 July – Ivy Evelyn Woodward is admitted as the first woman Member of the Royal College of Physicians.
 1 July – The British Indian army officer and politician Curzon Wyllie is shot dead at the Imperial Institute in South Kensington, London; his assassin, Madan Lal Dhingra, an Indian nationalist, is subsequently sentenced to death and hanged at Pentonville Prison on 17 August.
 25 July – Louis Blériot flies a Blériot XI monoplane across the English Channel from Calais to Dover, winning a prize of £ from the Daily Mail.
 23 August – the Secret Service Bureau counter-espionage unit (later known as MI5) is secretly established.
 3 September – the first Boy Scout rally held at The Crystal Palace in London.
 17 September – militant suffragette Mabel Capper is among the first to suffer force-feeding while on hunger strike, at Winson Green Prison in Birmingham.
 20 September – Labour Exchanges Act leads to setting up of labour exchanges as a source of information on employment.
 2 October – the first match is played at the Rugby Football Union's Twickenham Stadium in Middlesex, Harlequins v. Richmond.
 15–23 October – "Aviation week" of demonstration flying held at Doncaster; this is followed by a similar event at Blackpool.
 20 October – the Trade Boards Act, a form of minimum wage legislation, is passed. 
 5 November – the first Woolworth's branch in the UK opens in Liverpool.
 8 November – first contest for a Lonsdale Belt in boxing, won by Welsh lightweight Freddie Welsh in London.
 30 November – the House of Lords rejects the People's Budget proposed by David Lloyd George, forcing a general election.
 3 December – the SS Ellan Vannin sinks in Liverpool Bay resulting in the loss of all 15 passengers and 21 crew.
 4 December – the University of Bristol is founded and receives its Royal Charter.
 7 December – South Africa granted dominion status.

Undated
 First British bird ringing programme initiated by Arthur Landsborough Thomson at Aberdeen.

Publications
 Florence Barclay's novel The Rosary.
 Angela Brazil's schoolgirl story The Nicest Girl in the School.
 Daniel Jones' introductory The Pronunciation of English.
 H. G. Wells' novels Ann Veronica and Tono-Bungay.

Births
 24 January – Martin Lings, Islamic scholar (died 2005)
 28 January – Geoff Charles, photojournalist (died 2002)
 29 January – Phoebe Hesketh, poet (died 2005)
 9 February – Marjorie Ogilvie Anderson, historian (died 2002)
 14 March – William Montgomery Watt, Anglican priest and professor (died 2006)
 26 March – Martin Hodgson, rugby league footballer (died 1991)
 6 April - Katherine Russell, social worker and university teacher (died 1998)
 30 April – F. E. McWilliam, sculptor (died 1992)
 11 May – Herbert Murrill, organist and composer (died 1952)
 15 May – James Mason, actor (died 1984)
 16 May – Charles Wilson, political scientist (died 2002)
 18 May – Fred Perry, tennis player (died 1995)
 19 May – Nicholas Winton, humanitarian (died 2015)
 26 May – Matt Busby, football manager (Manchester United) (died 1994)
 7 June – Jessica Tandy, actress (died 1994)
 18 June – Christabel Bielenberg, writer (died 2003)
 28 June – Eric Ambler, novelist and playwright (died 1998)
 3 July – Sylvia Gray, businessperson (died 1991)
 4 July – Robert Manuel Cook, classical scholar (died 2000)
 5 July – Douglas Dodds-Parker, soldier and politician (died 2006)
 19 July – Percy Stallard, cyclist (died 2001)
 28 July – Malcolm Lowry, novelist (died 1957)
 30 July – C. Northcote Parkinson, historian and author (died 1993)
 25 August – Michael Rennie, actor (died 1971)
 28 August – Ralph Kilner Brown, athlete, politician and judge (died 2003)
 14 September – Peter Scott, ornithologist and painter (died 1989)
 23 September 
 Molly Harrison, museum curator (died 2002)
 Susan Travers, World War II nurse (died 2003)
 6 October – Robert Potter, architect (died 2010)
 28 October – Francis Bacon, painter (died 1992)
 8 November – Eric Bedford, architect (died 2001)
 17 November – E. S. Turner, author and journalist (died 2006)
 19 November – Griffith Jones, actor (died 2007)
 23 November – Nigel Tranter, historian and writer (died 2000)
 30 November – Nancy Carline, artist (died 2004) 
 1 December – Frank Gillard, radio broadcaster (died 1998)
 4 December 
Edward Britton, trade unionist (died 2005)
Jimmy Jewel, comedian and actor (died 1995)
 8 December – Lesslie Newbigin, bishop and theologian (died 1998)
 10 December – F. W. Walbank, scholar of Greek history (died 2008)
 15 December – Jack Gwillim, actor (died 2001)
 23 December
 Donald Coggan, Archbishop of Canterbury (died 2000)
 Maurice Denham, actor (died 2002)

Deaths
 8 January – Harry Seeley, palaeontologist (born 1839)
 14 January – Arthur William à Beckett, journalist (born 1844)
 24 February – Fanny Cornforth, artists' model (born 1835)
 1 April – Sir Marshal Clarke, Anglo-Irish colonial administrator (born 1841)
 10 April – Algernon Charles Swinburne, poet (born 1837)
 13 April – Sir Donald Currie, Scottish shipping magnate (born 1825)
 12 May – Sir Hugh Gough, general, Victoria Cross recipient (born 1833 in British India)
 18 May – George Meredith, novelist and poet (born 1828)
 31 May – Thomas Price, Welsh-born Prime Minister of South Australia (born 1852)
 10 June – Aylmer Spicer Cameron, Scottish army officer, VC recipient (born 1833)
 22 June – Edward John Gregory, painter (born 1850)
 1 July – Curzon Wyllie, soldier and politician (murdered) (born 1848)
 9 July
 George Robinson, 1st Marquess of Ripon, politician (born 1827)
 Rosa Nouchette Carey, children's writer (born 1840)
 1 August – Sir Hugh Rowlands, Welsh general, first Welsh Victoria Cross recipient (born 1828)
 14 August – William Stanley, inventor, precision engineer (born 1829)
 22 August – Henry Radcliffe Crocker, dermatologist (born 1846)
 25 October – Arthur Bromley, British Royal Navy officer, Admiral Superintendent of Malta Dockyard (born 1847)
 9 November – William Powell Frith, painter (born 1819)
 10 November – George Essex Evans, Welsh-Australian poet (born 1863)
 11 December – Ludwig Mond, industrialist (born 1839)
 13 December – Sir Alfred Lewis Jones, shipping magnate (born 1845)

See also
 List of British films before 1920

References

 
Years of the 20th century in the United Kingdom